Lenin Komsomol park is a popular recreation area in Donetsk. It was considered back in 1952, when Central Scherbakov Park of Culture and Leisure could no more fully address the city needs because "Shakhtar" stadium was built on its territory. The park was laid out only in 1956 due to numerous modifications of design; the same  year the 20th anniversary of Maxim Gorky death was commemorated, so the park was first named after M. Gorky. In 1958 the 40th Anniversary of Lenin Komsomol alley was established, and the park was subsequently renamed to Lenin Komsomol Park (official renaming in 1972).

Places of interest 
 1972 :сhildren's railway named after V. Priklonsky, ex-head of Donetsk railway
 1975: Youth and Sports Palace "Yunost" (Eng. – "Youth"), opened at the entry to the park
 Monument "To your Liberators, Donbas", open on 8 May 1984, the biggest monument in South-Eastern Ukraine and the city's and region's main war history monument
 Monument to the Peacekeeping Soldiers (veterans of Soviet–Afghan War). The monument was opened on 7 May 1996
 Fairy Tale Meadow, an amusement place for children in the forest, where sculptures of fairy-tale characters are built
 Donbass Arena Stadium

Gallery

References

External links 
 A comprehensive Donetsk city guide for international travellers - English
 Official Donetsk city guide - English
 Traveller's guide, Welcome to Donetsk - English
 Donetsk Children railway website 
 

Donetsk
Parks in Ukraine
Tourist attractions in Donetsk Oblast